Bookish.com is a content discovery and ecommerce website, which launched in February 2013, devoted to books. The site allows users to browse an extensive database of books and authors, add books to user-created digital "shelves", get custom book recommendations, read editorial content and purchase physical books, ebooks, and audiobooks.

History
Bookish was founded in 2011 in a joint venture backed by three of the big six publishing companies – Hachette Book Group, Penguin Group (USA), and Simon & Schuster – with the goal of increasing the presence of book publishers in the book-buying industry (which was becoming increasingly dominated by Amazon.com  due to the increased popularity of online bookstores), as well as to expand the overall book-buying market. 

The site was expected to launch in the summer of 2011, but the launch was delayed due to technical issues relating to data compilation, as well as a lawsuit filed by the United States Department of Justice in 2012 against Apple Inc. and five major publishing companies regarding the pricing of ebooks. The site officially launched in February 2013 with the support of sixteen additional publishing companies.

In early 2014, online ebook retailer Zola Books,  attracted by the site's sophisticated “algorithmic software” that offers reading suggestions,  acquired Bookish.

Features
Custom book recommendations
User-created digital bookshelves
Goodreads shelf-import feature
Articles, newsletters, and author interviews
Book lists, reviews, and listicles
eReader app for Android/iPhone
Online bookstore

See also
 aNobii
 Babelio
 BookArmy
 Readgeek

References

External links
Official Website
Book Summary App
Tales In Time Website

American book websites